FVL may refer to:
 Factor V, a protein
 Fox Valley Lutheran High School, in Appleton, Wisconsin, United States
 Future Vertical Lift, a program of the United States Armed Forces